Gotham City is a jazz album by saxophonist Dexter Gordon recorded in 1980 and released by Columbia in 1981.

Reception

AllMusic reviewer Scott Yanow awarded the album 3 stars and wrote that "Dexter Gordon was still in pretty good form at the time of this later recording" and "the quality of the solos is quite high".

Track listing
 "Hi-Fly" (Randy Weston) – 9:33
 "A Nightingale Sang in Berkeley Square" (Eric Maschwitz, Manning Sherwin) – 7:12
 "The Blues Walk (Loose Walk)" (Clifford Brown) – 8:17
 "Gotham City" (Dexter Gordon) – 9:18

Personnel
Dexter Gordon – tenor saxophone
George Benson – electric guitar (tracks 1 & 4)
Woody Shaw – trumpet (track 3)
Cedar Walton – piano
Percy Heath – bass
Art Blakey – drums

Technical
Don Puluse - engineer
Maxine Gregg - executive producer
Richard Avedon - photography

References

1981 albums
Dexter Gordon albums
albums produced by Michael Cuscuna
Columbia Records albums